This is a chronological list of female classical professional concert violinists. Those without a known date of birth are listed separately in alphabetical order.

Sortable list
Total listed:

Sortable list for those without known birthdate
Total listed:

See also
List of women classical pianists
Lists of women in music
Women in music

Citations

General references

"Female Performers on the Violin", The Musical World, No.CLXVI – New Series No.LXXII, p. 34 (May 16, 1839)
"Famous Violinists of To-day and Yesterday", Chapter X. "Women as Violini", Henry C. Lahee (1899)
"Lady Violinists", The Musical Times, Vol. 47, No. 764, pp. 662–668 (Oct. 1, 1906)
An Encyclopedia of the Violin, Alberto Bachmann (1926)
"Violino e Violinisti", Enciclopedia Italiana Treccani (1937)
"Violin virtuosos: from Paganini to the 21st century", Henry Roth (1997)
"Allievi di Hubay (selezione)" , Gianluca La Villa (2003)
"Great female violinists of the past", Violinist.com – Blog (2010)
"Violin works with connections to female violinists", Violinist.com – Blog (2011)
"Great Female Violinists: A List" – Blog (2011)
Article: "Addendum on Female Violinists" by George Dubourg (1852) – Blog (2011)
"Who were the early female violinists?", The Strad (March 7, 2014)
"musikwissenschaftliche Frauen- und Geschlechterforschung", search page in German – Sophie Drinke Institut (c)2013

 
Female
Women violinists
Violinists
 

cs:Seznam houslistů
de:Liste von Violinisten
it:Violinisti classici
nl:Lijst van beroemde violisten